Highway 56 is a provincial highway in the Canadian province of Saskatchewan. It runs from Highway 1 near Indian Head to Highway 210 within the Echo Valley Provincial Park.

Highway 56 passes near Pasqua and Echo Lakes of the Fishing Lakes, and so has access to many recreational areas.

Major intersections
From south to north:

Photo gallery

See also
Roads in Saskatchewan

References

056